The following is an alphabetical list of articles related to the U.S. state of West Virginia.

0–9 

.wv.us – Internet second-level domain for the state of West Virginia
35th state to join the United States of America

A
Adjacent states:

Agriculture in West Virginia
Airports in West Virginia
Alcohol laws of West Virginia
Amusement parks in West Virginia
Arboreta in West Virginia
commons:Category:Arboreta in West Virginia
Archaeology in West Virginia
:Category:Archaeological sites in West Virginia
commons:Category:Archaeological sites in West Virginia
Architecture in West Virginia
Area codes in West Virginia
Art museums and galleries in West Virginia
commons:Category:Art museums and galleries in West Virginia
Astronomical observatories in West Virginia
commons:Category:Astronomical observatories in West Virginia

B
Battle of Bolivar Heights
Battle of Buffington Island
Battle of Bulltown
Battle of Camp Allegheny
Battle of Carnifex Ferry
Battle of Charleston (1862)
Battle of Charlestown
Battle of Cheat Mountain
Battle of Corrick's Ford
Battle of Droop Mountain
Battle of Greenbrier River
Battle of Hancock
Battle of Harpers Ferry
Battle of Hoke's Run
Battle of Kabletown
Battle of Kessler's Cross Lanes
Battle of Moorefield
Battle of Philippi (1861)
Battle of Princeton Court House
Battle of Rich Mountain
Battle of Scary Creek
Battle of Shepherdstown
Battle of Smithfield Crossing
Battle of Summit Point
Botanical gardens in West Virginia
commons:Category:Botanical gardens in West Virginia
Buildings and structures in West Virginia
commons:Category:Buildings and structures in West Virginia

C

Cannabis in West Virginia
Canyons and gorges of West Virginia
commons:Category:Canyons and gorges of West Virginia
Capital of the state of West Virginia
Capital punishment in West Virginia
Capitol of the state of West Virginia
commons:Category:West Virginia State Capitol
Casinos in West Virginia
Caves of West Virginia
commons:Category:Caves of West Virginia
Census-designated places in West Virginia
Census statistical areas of West Virginia
Charleston, West Virginia, state capital 1870-1875 and since 1885
Cities and towns along the Potomac River
Cities in West Virginia
commons:Category:Cities in West Virginia
Climate change in West Virginia 
Climate of West Virginia
Colleges and universities in West Virginia
commons:Category:Universities and colleges in West Virginia
Communications in West Virginia
commons:Category:Communications in West Virginia
Communities in the Eastern Panhandle of West Virginia
Companies in West Virginia
Convention centers in West Virginia
commons:Category:Convention centers in West Virginia
Counties of the state of West Virginia
commons:Category:Counties in West Virginia
County road routes in West Virginia
Crime in West Virginia
Culture of West Virginia
commons:Category:West Virginia culture

D
Demographics of West Virginia

E
Economy of West Virginia
:Category:Economy of West Virginia
commons:Category:Economy of West Virginia
Education in West Virginia
:Category:Education in West Virginia
commons:Category:Education in West Virginia
Elections in the state of West Virginia
commons:Category:West Virginia elections
Environment of West Virginia
commons:Category:Environment of West Virginia

F

Festivals in West Virginia
commons:Category:Festivals in West Virginia
Flag of the state of West Virginia
Forts in West Virginia
:Category:Forts in West Virginia
commons:Category:Forts in West Virginia

G

Geography of West Virginia
:Category:Geography of West Virginia
commons:Category:Geography of West Virginia
Geology of West Virginia
:Category:Geology of West Virginia
commons:Category:Geology of West Virginia
Ghost towns in West Virginia
:Category:Ghost towns in West Virginia
commons:Category:Ghost towns in West Virginia
Golf clubs and courses in West Virginia
Government of the state of West Virginia  website
:Category:Government of West Virginia
commons:Category:Government of West Virginia
Governor of the State of West Virginia
List of governors of West Virginia
Great Seal of the State of West Virginia
Gun laws in West Virginia

H
Heritage railroads in West Virginia
commons:Category:Heritage railroads in West Virginia
High schools of West Virginia
Higher education in West Virginia
Highway system of West Virginia
List of primary state highways in West Virginia
List of secondary state highways in West Virginia
Hiking trails in West Virginia
commons:Category:Hiking trails in West Virginia
History of West Virginia
Historical outline of West Virginia
:Category:History of West Virginia
commons:Category:History of West Virginia
Hospitals in West Virginia
Hot springs of West Virginia
commons:Category:Hot springs of West Virginia
House of Representatives of the State of West Virginia

I
Images of West Virginia
commons:Category:West Virginia
Interstate highway routes in West Virginia
Islands of West Virginia

J

K

L
Lakes in West Virginia
:Category:Lakes of West Virginia
commons:Category:Lakes of West Virginia
Landmarks in West Virginia
commons:Category:Landmarks in West Virginia
LGBT rights in West Virginia
Lists related to the state of West Virginia:
List of Appalachian Regional Commission counties#West Virginia
List of airports in West Virginia
List of census-designated places in West Virginia
List of census statistical areas in West Virginia
List of cities and towns along the Potomac River
List of cities in West Virginia
List of colleges and universities in West Virginia
List of communities in the Eastern Panhandle of West Virginia
List of counties in West Virginia
List of county roads in West Virginia
List of dams and reservoirs in West Virginia
List of forts in West Virginia
List of ghost towns in West Virginia
List of governors of West Virginia
List of high schools in West Virginia
List of hospitals in West Virginia
List of Interstate highway routes in West Virginia
List of islands of West Virginia
List of lakes in West Virginia
List of law enforcement agencies in West Virginia
List of museums in West Virginia
List of National Historic Landmarks in West Virginia
List of newspapers in West Virginia
List of people from West Virginia
List of power stations in West Virginia
List of primary state highways in West Virginia
List of radio stations in West Virginia
List of radio stations in West Virginia by market area
List of railroads in West Virginia
List of Registered Historic Places in West Virginia
List of rivers of West Virginia
List of school districts in West Virginia
List of secondary state highways in West Virginia
List of state forests in West Virginia
List of state highway routes in West Virginia
List of state parks in West Virginia
List of state prisons in West Virginia
List of symbols of the state of West Virginia
List of telephone area codes in West Virginia
List of television shows and movies in West Virginia
List of television stations in West Virginia
List of towns in West Virginia
List of United States congressional delegations from West Virginia
List of United States congressional districts in West Virginia
List of United States representatives from West Virginia
List of United States senators from West Virginia
List of U.S. highway routes in West Virginia
List of villages in West Virginia
List of wildlife management areas in West Virginia

M
Maps of West Virginia
commons:Category:Maps of West Virginia
Mass media in West Virginia
Mountains of West Virginia
commons:Category:Mountains of West Virginia
Museums in West Virginia
:Category:Museums in West Virginia
commons:Category:Museums in West Virginia
Music of West Virginia
:Category:Music of West Virginia
commons:Category:Music of West Virginia
:Category:Musical groups from West Virginia
:Category:Musicians from West Virginia

N
National Forests of West Virginia
commons:Category:National Forests of West Virginia
Natural history of West Virginia
commons:Category:Natural history of West Virginia
Newspapers of West Virginia

O
Ohio River

P
People from West Virginia
:Category:People from West Virginia
commons:Category:People from West Virginia
:Category:People by city in West Virginia
:Category:People by county in West Virginia
:Category:People from West Virginia by occupation
Politics of West Virginia
:Category:Politics of West Virginia
commons:Category:Politics of West Virginia
Primary state highways in West Virginia
Protected areas of West Virginia
commons:Category:Protected areas of West Virginia

Q
Quinwood coal city

R
Radio stations in West Virginia
Radio stations in West Virginia by market area
Railroad museums in West Virginia
commons:Category:Railroad museums in West Virginia
Railroads in West Virginia
Registered historic places in West Virginia
commons:Category:Registered Historic Places in West Virginia
Religion in West Virginia
:Category:Religion in West Virginia
Rivers of West Virginia
commons:Category:Rivers of West Virginia
Rock formations in West Virginia
commons:Category:Rock formations in West Virginia

S
Same-sex marriage in West Virginia
School districts of West Virginia
Scouting in West Virginia
Secondary state highways in West Virginia
Senate of the State of West Virginia
Settlements in West Virginia
Cities in West Virginia
Towns in West Virginia
Villages in West Virginia
Census Designated Places in West Virginia
Other unincorporated communities in West Virginia
List of ghost towns in West Virginia
Siege of Fort Henry (1777)
Siege of Fort Henry (1782)
Ski areas and resorts in West Virginia
commons:Category:Ski areas and resorts in West Virginia
Sports in West Virginia
:Category:Sports in West Virginia
commons:Category:Sports in West Virginia
:Category:Sports venues in West Virginia
commons:Category:Sports venues in West Virginia
State Capitol of West Virginia
State highway routes of West Virginia
State of West Virginia  website
Government of the state of West Virginia
:Category:Government of West Virginia
commons:Category:Government of West Virginia
Executive branch of the government of the state of West Virginia
Governor of the state of West Virginia
Legislative branch of the government of the state of West Virginia
Legislature of the State of West Virginia
Senate of the State of West Virginia
House of Representatives of the State of West Virginia
Judicial branch of the government of the state of West Virginia
Supreme Court of the State of West Virginia
State forests in West Virginia
State parks of West Virginia
commons:Category:State parks of West Virginia
State prisons of West Virginia
Structures in West Virginia
commons:Category:Buildings and structures in West Virginia
Supreme Court of the State of West Virginia
Symbols of the state of West Virginia
:Category:Symbols of West Virginia
commons:Category:Symbols of West Virginia

T
Telecommunications in West Virginia
commons:Category:Communications in West Virginia
Telephone area codes in West Virginia
Television shows and movies in West Virginia
Television stations in West Virginia
Theatres in West Virginia
commons:Category:Theatres in West Virginia
Tourism in West Virginia  website
commons:Category:Tourism in West Virginia
Towns in West Virginia
commons:Category:Cities in West Virginia
Transportation in West Virginia
:Category:Transportation in West Virginia
commons:Category:Transport in West Virginia

U
United States of America
States of the United States of America
United States census statistical areas of West Virginia
United States congressional delegations from West Virginia
United States congressional districts in West Virginia
United States Court of Appeals for the Fourth Circuit
United States District Court for the Northern District of West Virginia
United States District Court for the Southern District of West Virginia
United States representatives from West Virginia
United States senators from West Virginia
Universities and colleges in West Virginia
commons:Category:Universities and colleges in West Virginia
US-WV – ISO 3166-2:US region code for the state of West Virginia

V
Villages in West Virginia

W
Washington-Arlington-Alexandria, DC-VA-MD-WV Metropolitan Statistical Area
Washington-Baltimore-Northern Virginia, DC-MD-VA-WV Combined Statistical Area
Waterfalls of West Virginia
commons:Category:Waterfalls of West Virginia
West Virginia  website
:Category:West Virginia
commons:Category:West Virginia
commons:Category:Maps of West Virginia
West Virginia Healthy Lifestyles Act of 2005
The West Virginia Rosie the Riveter Project
West Virginia Route 2 and I-68 Authority
West Virginia State Capitol
Wheeling, West Virginia, state capital 1863-1870 and 1875–1885
Wikimedia
Wikimedia Commons:Category:West Virginia
commons:Category:Maps of West Virginia
Wikinews:Category:West Virginia
Wikinews:Portal:West Virginia
Wikipedia Category:West Virginia
Wikipedia:WikiProject West Virginia
:Category:WikiProject West Virginia articles
Wikipedia:WikiProject West Virginia/Members
Wildlife management areas in West Virginia
Wind power in West Virginia
WV – United States Postal Service postal code for the state of West Virginia

X

Y

Z
Zoos in West Virginia
commons:Category:Zoos in West Virginia

See also

Topic overview:
West Virginia
Outline of West Virginia

 

 
West Virginia